Ho Ming-tsan (born 12 May 1983 in Alian, Kaohsiung) is a Taiwanese professional footballer who has played for Taiwan Power Company F.C. and Chinese Taipei national football team as second striker or midfielder.

International career

International goals
Scores and results list Chinese Taipei's goal tally first.

Honors
 National First Division Football League 2005 Top Scorer
 2011 AFC President's Cup Top Scorer

References

External links
 Ho Ming-tsan at LTSports 

1983 births
Living people
Footballers from Kaohsiung
Chinese Taipei international footballers
Association football forwards
Taiwanese footballers
Fu Jen Catholic University alumni